Andrei Gurănescu (born September 24, 1967 in Bucharest) is a Romanian former rugby union football player and current coach. He played as a flanker.

He coached RCP Meaux in France.

Club career
Gurănescu played for arch-rivals Steaua and Dinamo Bucharest. He also played in Italy and France.

International career
Gurănescu gathered 17 caps for Romania, from his debut in 1991 to his last game in 1995. He scored 2 tries during his international career, 10 points on aggregate. He was a member of his national side for the 2nd and 3rd Rugby World Cups in 1991 and 1995 and played 3 group matches and scored a try against Springboks in Pool A match held in Cape Town, on 30 May 1995.

Personal life
His younger brother Șerban also played professionally in Romania, Italy and Académica de Coimbra in Portugal.

Honours

Club
Steaua Bucharest
SuperLiga  1986/87, 1987/88

Dinamo Bucharest
SuperLiga  1990/91, 1993/94, 1995/96, 1997/98
Romanian Cup  1988/89, 1995/96, 1996/97, 1997/98

References

External links
Andrei Gurănescu International statistics at ESPN
Andrei Gurănescu's profile at It'srugby

1967 births
Living people
Romanian rugby union players
Romania international rugby union players
CSA Steaua București (rugby union) players
CS Dinamo București (rugby union) players
Rugby union flankers
Rugby union players from Bucharest
Romanian expatriate sportspeople in Italy